Henderson Auxiliary Field is a closed facility of the United States Army that is located two miles (3.2 km) north-northeast of Millers Ferry, Alabama. Following its closure, it was reopened as Henderson Airport.

History 
The airport was built in about 1942 as an auxiliary airfield to the Army pilot school at Craig Army Airfield. It was designated Craig Army Auxiliary Airfield #3. It had two 4,000-foot asphalt runways, oriented NNE/SSW & WNW/ESE. The field was said to not have any hangars. It was apparently unmanned unless necessary for aircraft recovery.

See also

 Alabama World War II Army Airfields

References 

 Abandoned Airports: Henderson Airport

External links 
Photos and aerial maps

Airfields of the United States Army Air Forces in Alabama
Airports in Alabama
Closed installations of the United States Army
Transportation buildings and structures in Wilcox County, Alabama